Expo Québec was an annual fair that took place in Quebec City in mid to late August from 1897 to 2015.

History
The first exposition began in 1854, the first full exhibition began after the establishment of the Québec City Provincial Exhibition Company in 1892.

The exposition site, now referred to as ExpoCité, had including a 1,000 seat stadium, racetrack and mostly agricultural theme. In 1913 a midway and roller coaster was added making it common with most modern fall fairs.

Demise
In early 2016 the City of Quebec announced that Expo Québec would not return in 2016 and the site next to Videotron Centre (once the race track site) would be re-developed mirroring the collapse of the Ottawa SuperEX in Ottawa, Ontario in 2011. The former Colisée Pepsi closed in 2011 and is also expected to be demolished.

See also

Other remaining expositions in Quebec include:

 Expo agricole de La Matapédia - Bas-Saint-Laurent
 Exposition Agricole de Beauce  - Chaudière-Appalaches
 Huntingdon Fair - Montérégie
 Ayer's Cliff Fair - Estrie
 Exposition agricole régionale d'Abitibi - Abitibi-Témiscamingue
 Expo Richmond Fair - Cleveland Richmond/Estrie

References

External links

Annual fairs
Festivals established in 1892
Exhibitions in Canada
Festivals in Quebec City
Summer events in Canada